The Parco Suburbano San Francesco  (Suburban Park San Francesco) is located below the bastion of Piazza Bagolino, in Alcamo, at the entrance of the town, near Porta Palermo.

Description 

This mediterranean garden was created thanks to the approval of the project by the town administration, led by doctor Massimo Ferrara, Lord Mayor from 1993 to 2001.

In the sixties,  they had planned the creation of some outdoor sports facilities in this area; at the time Mr. Ludovico Corrao (later Lord Mayor of Alcamo from 1960 to 1962) was the Regional Minister for Public Works under the government of Silvio Milazzo. 
He got to realize some works in Alcamo, among which the bronze bas-reliefs of Porta Palermo, commissioned to the sculptor Nicola Rubino,  representing "The poet Cielo d'Alcamo at Frederick II, Holy Roman Emperor’s court" and  "Active life in Alcamo".

The park, with an area of about 12,000 square metres, is like a charming garden with various kinds of plants and trees, typical of the flora of macchia mediterranea. As soon as you get in, on the right you can see the memorial tree, dedicated to the two carabiniers killed on 27 January 1977 in the Strage di Alcamo Marina’ slaughter: Carmine Apuzzo and Salvatore Falcetta.

On 18 November 2014 the town administration, led by doctor Sebastiano Bonventre, by public invitation, entrusted it to Associazione Laurus, whose President was dottor Gianni Gervasi at that time; its volunteers soon provided to clean it and do the maintenance of the green. Moreover, they realized a playground for children, a little petting zoo and an easy access for disabled people.

Activity 
During the school year,  they make cultural and gaming activities for children, and various educational workshops for the pupils of primary school.

In August, since 2010, "Alcart - legalità e cultura" organizes some events with different events (exhibitions, seminars, music, theatre etc.).

In April 2016,  there was another event called “Festa di Primavera” (Spring Festival): its aim was to let children approach nature; besides taking part in lessons and games, they also saw the planting of some little plants of flowers given by Associazione Laurus itself.

In September 2016, the same association organized the Giornata Nazionale dei Giochi della Gentilezza (the National Day of the Games of Kindness),  for kids aged 6–14: the aim of this activity was to reinforce interpersonal skills,  accepting and collaborating with other people, and motivating to the use of kind words, being inspired by stories.

Finally, in December, they realized the third edition of the event Natale al Parco (Christmas at the Park), with choruses,  exhibitions, parades, Christmas markets  and the Living Crib.

See also 
 Alcamo
 Riserva naturale Bosco di Alcamo
 Nicola Rubino
 Ludovico Corrao

References

Sources

External links 
 https://web.archive.org/web/20170911023830/http://www.laurus-culturambiente.it/
 http://www.tp24.it/2016/09/27/cronaca/alcamo-raid-vandalico-al-parco-suburbano-san-francesco/103407
 http://www.paginegialle.it/alcamo-tp/parchi-naturali/parco-suburbano-san-francesco
 
 http://eventerbee.it/event/alcart-festival-7-edizione,1214494158590481
 http://massimoprovenza.blogspot.it/2009/06/alcamo-ecco-il-parco-suburbano-dopo-una.html
 http://www.alqamah.it/2014/11/18/consegna-ufficiale-del-parco-suburbano-allassociazione-laurus/
 http://www.trapaniok.it/17325/Cronaca-trapani/alcamo---associazione-laurus-cultura--ambientale

Parks in Sicily